Panadiplon (U-78875) is an anxiolytic drug with a novel chemical structure that is not closely related to other drugs of this type. It has a similar pharmacological profile to the benzodiazepine family of drugs, but with mainly anxiolytic properties and relatively little sedative or amnestic effect, and so is classified as a nonbenzodiazepine anxiolytic.

Panadiplon acts as a high-affinity GABAA receptor partial agonist, but despite showing a useful effects profile of a potent anxiolytic with little sedative effects, panadiplon was discontinued from clinical development for use in humans after showing evidence of liver damage in both animals and human trials. Panadiplon however continues to be used in animal research, mainly as a subtype-selective reference drug to compare other GABAA agonists against.

References 

Sedatives
Anxiolytics
Hepatotoxins
Oxadiazoles
Lactams
Cyclopropanes
GABAA receptor positive allosteric modulators
Isopropyl compounds